The Petah Tikva Subdistrict is one of Israel's subdistricts in Central District. The subdistrict was created from an amalgamation of parts of Mandatory Palestine's Jaffa Subdistrict, Ramle Subdistrict, and Tulkarm Subdistrict

The Principal city of this subdistrict, as the name implies, is Petah Tikva.

References